The Cayman Islands women's national rugby sevens team represents the Cayman Islands in international sevens rugby. They often compete in the RAN Women's Sevens tournaments.

The Cayman Islands competed at the 2022 RAN Women's Sevens Qualifiers in Nassau, Bahamas.

Players

Recent squad 
Squad to 2022 RAN Women's Sevens Qualifiers.

Previous squad 
Cayman Sevens Squad vs. Jamaica 2000:
 Karen Jessup
 Jessica Lane
 Tracy Iler
 Lisa Kehoe
 Janie Fleming
 Jane Robson
 Lorna Campbell
 Sinead Quinn
 Julie Falconer
 Rebecca Heap
 Michelle Cascante
 Angelique Crowther
 Sharon Hedger

References

External link 

 Cayman Rugby Football Union

Women's national rugby sevens teams
Rugby union in the Cayman Islands
Women's sport in the Cayman Islands